The 1997 World Marathon Cup was the seventh edition of the World Marathon Cup of athletics and were held in Athens, Greece, inside of the 1997 World Championships.

Results

See also
1997 World Championships in Athletics – Men's Marathon
1997 World Championships in Athletics – Women's Marathon

References

External links
 IAAF web site

World Marathon Cup
World
Sports competitions in Athens
Marathons in Greece
1997 in Greek sport
International athletics competitions hosted by Greece
Athletics in Athens